Movistar Team Ecuador is an Ecuadorian cycling team established in 2014 as UCI Continental until 2019.

Team roster

Major wins
2014
 Road Race Championships, Byron Guamá
 Time Trial Championships, José Ragonessi
Stage 1 Volta ao Alentejo, Byron Guamá
Pan American Road Race Championships, Byron Guamá
Stages 2 & 3 Tour des Pays de Savoie, Jordi Simón
2015
Overall GP Internacional do Guadiana, Jordi Simón
Stage 1, Jordi Simón
Overall Volta Ciclística Internacional do Rio Grande do Sul, Byron Guamá
Stages 3 & 4, Byron Guamá
Stage 5 Vuelta Mexico Telmex, Byron Guamá
Pan American Road Race Championships, Byron Guamá
Stage 5 Vuelta a Venezuela, Byron Guamá
 Road Race Championships, José Ragonessi
2016
Stage 3 Volta Ciclística Internacional do Rio Grande do Sul, Byron Guamá
Stage 5 Volta Ciclística Internacional do Rio Grande do Sul, Jefferson Cepeda
Stage 8 Vuelta a Venezuela, Byron Guamá
2018
Stage 9 Vuelta a Venezuela, Byron Guamá
2019
 U23 Time Trial Championships, Lenin Javier Montenegro

References

Cycling teams established in 2014
2014 establishments in Ecuador
Cycling teams based in Ecuador